Audrey Chikani-Muhundika (born 30 August 1954) is a Zambian athlete. She competed in the women's long jump at the 1972 Summer Olympics.

References

External links
 

1954 births
Living people
Athletes (track and field) at the 1972 Summer Olympics
Zambian female long jumpers
Olympic athletes of Zambia
Place of birth missing (living people)